A folding bridge is a type of moveable bridge.

An example of a folding bridge is the Hörnbrücke (Hörn Bridge) in the city of Kiel in the German state of Schleswig-Holstein. It is a three-segment bascule bridge that folds in the shape of the letter N.

See also
 Bascule bridge
 Double-beam drawbridge
 Drawbridge
 Moveable bridges for a list of other moveable bridge types 

Moveable bridges

Bridges by structural type